Provincial Trunk Highway 17 (PTH 17) is a provincial highway in the Canadian province of Manitoba. It runs from a junction with PR 325 near Hodgson to a junction with PTH 9 near Winnipeg Beach.

PTH 17 is signed as a north-south route from PR 325 to PTH 7 at Teulon and an east-west route from PTH 7 to PTH 9.  The majority of the route is paved, with a gravel section between PTH 8 and PTH 9.  The speed limit is  except through urban areas.  

The route near Narcisse can be very dangerous as thousands of snakes cross PTH 17 to get to/from the Narcisse Snake Dens.  As snakes are run over by vehicles, the road becomes very slippery.  A series of 'garter-snake fences' were built in this area to protect both the snakes and vehicle traffic.

History
Prior to 1964, PTH 17 was the designation of the route connecting PTH 3 near Crystal City to the Canada - US border. This highway is now the southernmost section of PTH 34.

Originally, the section north of PR 231 (along with the section of PR 231 from there to PTH 7) was the northern configuration of PTH 7 between 1956 and 1966 before it was reconfigured to its current route. After PTH 7 was reconfigured to Arborg, the route was redesignated as PTH 16. The section south of what is now PR 231 was designated as PR 228. The route number was eliminated in 1979 when the Manitoba portion of the Yellowhead Highway was changed from PTH 4 to PTH 16 so that the route maintained one number throughout the four western provinces. PTH 16 was eliminated and it became an extension of PR 228 and PR 231.

PTH 17 was designated in 1983, replacing part of PR 228, but its south end was at PTH 7. In 1987, PTH 17 was extended east to PTH 8, replacing the remainder of PTH 228. It extended east to its current end in 1989. This final extension is a gravel road.

Major intersections

References

017